The Virus Information Alliance (VIA) is an international partnership created by the Microsoft Corporation in association with various antivirus software vendors. Alliance members exchange technical information about newly discovered malicious software (malware) so they can quickly communicate information to customers.

VIA Member Roles
The roles of VIA member companies include but are not limited to is to share current data with Microsoft and other VIA partners on all malicious programs detected. The description of each virus incident will provide data on: the scope and rate of virus propagation, attack targets and ways in which end users can avoid infection by malicious code.

VIA Member Companies 
 Aladdin Knowledge Systems
 Authentium
 Computer Associates
 Cylance
 ESET
 F-secure
 Fortinet
 Global Hauri
 Kaspersky Lab
 McAfee Anti-Virus Emergency Response Team
 Norman ASA
 Panda Security
 Qihoo 360
 Sophos
 Symantec
 Trend Micro TrendLabs
 VirusBuster
Kingsoft

See also
Microsoft

Antivirus software

References

External links
 Microsoft Malware Protection Center Website, home of the VIA 
 Kingsoft office 

Organizations established in 1993